Trichilia trachyantha is a species of plant in the family Meliaceae. It is endemic to Cuba.

References

Flora of Cuba
trachyantha
Endangered plants
Taxonomy articles created by Polbot